Robert Chester and Elsie H. Lowe House is a historic home located at Banner Elk, Avery County, North Carolina. It was built in 1949, and is a -story, Minimal Traditional-style house.  It has a cross-gable roofline, random-range quarry-faced stone walls, two tapered stone chimneys and a shed-roof porch.  Also on the property are the contributing barn and corn crib (1949).

It was listed on the National Register of Historic Places in 2013.

References

Houses on the National Register of Historic Places in North Carolina
Houses completed in 1949
Houses in Avery County, North Carolina
National Register of Historic Places in Avery County, North Carolina